Henry H. Ketcham was born on December 1, 1949.

Executive appointments 

In 1999 he was appointed an independent board member of the TD Bank. He was the President and CEO of West Fraser Timber until 2012.

Awards 

Ketcham is a 1996 recipient of the Order of British Columbia.

References 

1949 births
Living people